Krishan Kant (28 February 1927 – 27 July 2002) was an Indian politician who served as the tenth vice president of India from 1997 until his death 2002. Formerly, he was the governor of Andhra Pradesh from 1990 to 1997. He was a member of Lok Sabha from Chandigarh (1977-1980), and Member of Rajya Sabha from Haryana (1966-1972, 1972–1977).

Early life 
Kant was born on 28 February 1927 in Kot Mohammad Khan a village of Tarn Taran district in the Punjab Province of British India. His parents were independence activists Lala Achint Ram and Satyavati Devi.

Kant completed his MSc (Technology) from the Banaras Hindu University. He worked as a scientist with the Council of Scientific and Industrial Research, New Delhi.

Political career
The son of noted Congress politician and later parliamentarian, Lala Achint Ram, Kant's first brush with politics came when he plunged into the Quit India movement, while he was still a student in Lahore. He took part in the Indian Independence Movement as a youth and continued to be involved in politics, eventually being elected to Parliament of India. He was part of the "Young Turk" brigade of Indian National Congress party during the time of Indira Gandhi.

He held important official positions in the parliamentary and organisational wings of the Indian National Congress, the Janata Party and the Janata Dal. For many years, he was a member of the Executive Council of the Institute for Defence Studies and Analyses.

Krishan Kant was the founding general secretary of the People's Union for Civil Liberties and Democratic Rights, of which Jayprakash Narayan was the President in 1976. He was expelled from the Indian National Congress in 1975 for his opposition to the Emergency. He was later a member of Lok Sabha till 1980. He was the chairman of Committee on Railway Reservations and Bookings from 1972 to 1977.

He with Madhu Limaye was also responsible for the collapse of the Morarji Desai government installed by that coalition, by insisting that no member of the Janata Party could be the member of Rashtriya Swayamsevak Sangh (RSS). This attack on dual membership was directed specifically at members of the Janata Party who had been members of the Jan Sangh, and continued to be members of the right-wing RSS, the Jan Sangh's ideological parent. The issue led to fall of Morarji Desai government in 1979, and the destruction of the Janata coalition.

A strong protagonist of India going nuclear, Krishan Kant was a member of the executive council of the Institute of Defence Studies and Analysis.

Kant was appointed governor of Andhra Pradesh by the V.P. Singh government in 1989 and served in that position for seven years, becoming one of India's longest-serving governors. He stayed at that post till he was elevated as Vice-President of India.

He was elected vice-president by Parliament as the joint candidate of the Indian National Congress and United Front. While serving as vice-president, there was a terrorist attack on the Parliament building in 2001; terrorists used fake labels to gain access to the premises and they crashed into his car.

He died in New Delhi aged 75 after suffering from a massive heart attack on 27 July 2002, a few weeks before he was to leave the office to lead a retired life. (He is the only Indian Vice President to die in office.)

He was cremated with full state honours at Nigam Bodh Ghat in New Delhi on the banks of Yamuna river on 28 July, in the presence of various VIPs and was survived by his wife, mother, three children (two sons and a daughter along with their respective spouses), several grandchildren and a few great-grandchildren as well as two sisters and numerous other surviving family members.

His mother Satyavati Devi, another freedom fighter had also outlived him, finally dying in 2010.

A few days after his death, a former Chief Minister of Rajasthan, Bhairon Singh Shekhawat defeated Sushil Kumar Shinde in assuming the vice-presidency through a special election.

References

External links

 Profile (archived) on Embassy of India in Washington website

1927 births
2002 deaths
Banaras Hindu University alumni
Punjabi people
Governors of Andhra Pradesh
Governors of Tamil Nadu
Vice presidents of India
Lok Sabha members from Chandigarh
Indian National Congress politicians from Punjab, India
Janata Party politicians
Janata Dal politicians
Rajya Sabha members from Haryana
India MPs 1977–1979